Chris Evert defeated Mima Jaušovec in the final, 6–1, 6–2 to win the women's singles tennis title at the 1983 French Open. It was her fifth French Open singles title and her 15th major singles title overall.

Martina Navratilova was the defending champion, but was defeated in the fourth round by Kathy Horvath. It was her only loss for the entire year and ended a 39 match winning streak.

This edition of the French Open was the first to have a 128-player main draw.

This tournament marked the first major appearance of future world No. 1 and 22-time major champion Steffi Graf. At 13 years, 11 months and 9 days of age, Graf became the youngest player to compete in the main draw of a major. This was the final major appearance for former world No. 1 and seven-time major champion Evonne Goolagong.

Seeds

Qualifying

Draw

Finals

Top half

Section 1

Section 2

Section 3

Section 4

Bottom half

Section 5

Section 6

Section 7

Section 8

References

External links
1983 French Open – Women's draws and results at the International Tennis Federation

Women's Singles
French Open by year – Women's singles
French Open - Women's Singles
1983 in women's tennis
1983 in French women's sport